La Agustina is a neighborhood in the sector Cristo Rey, Santo Domingo in the Distrito Nacional of the Dominican Republic.

Sources 
Distrito Nacional sectors

Populated places in Santo Domingo